Ham Tin Tsuen or Ham Tin New Village is a village in Tai Wo Hau, Tsuen Wan District, Hong Kong.

Administration
Yuen Tuen New Village is a recognized village under the New Territories Small House Policy.

See also
 Tai Wo Hau station

References

External links

 Delineation of area of existing village Ham Tin (Tsuen Wan) for election of resident representative (2019 to 2022)

Villages in Tsuen Wan District, Hong Kong